An Bloem  is a 1983 Dutch film directed by Peter Oosthoek. It was his first feature-length film.

External links 
 

1983 drama films
Dutch films based on plays
1983 films
1980s Dutch-language films
Dutch drama films